Yo no te pido la luna (formerly known as Yo no soy esa), is a Colombia telenovela that premiered on 3 March 2010 on Caracol Televisión, but it was taken off the air and broadcast on Caracol Internacional. The telenovela was taken out of Caracol's programming, due to its low rating levels. It is considered one of the most "worst rating" telenovela in the history of Colombian television. The telenovela stars Anasol, and Ricardo Vélez.

Cast 
 Anasol as Juanita Román
 Ricardo Vélez as Alejandro Castillo
 Ángela Vergara as Tatiana Ivanova
 Talú Quintero as Elvira Castillo
 Juan Pablo Shuk as Fernando Sanclemente
 Ana María Trujillo as Soledad Castillo
 María Cristina Pimiento as Carolina Castillo
 Germán Patiño as Rodrigo Castillo
 Luisa Fernanda Giraldo as Magaly
 Santiago Cepeda as Sandro Román
 Kepa Amuchastegui as Vladimir Ivanov
 Constanza Camelo as Deyanira Dupre
 Mauricio Bastidas as Miguel
 George Slebi as Diego Colmenares
 Jéssica Sanjuán as Susana Espernancad
 Freddy Flórez as Lucas Dupre

References

External links 
 

2010 telenovelas
Colombian telenovelas
2010 Colombian television series debuts
Spanish-language television shows
Spanish-language telenovelas
2010 Colombian television series endings